Carlos Ruiz peleando con un cochero (English: Carlos Ruiz fighting with a coachman) is a Venezuelan slapstick comedy film created by and starring Carlos Ruiz Chapellín and Ricardo Rouffet. It was first played in the Circo Metropolitano de Caracas on November 26, 1897.

Background

Ruiz was a showman by trade, and rented the Circo Metropolitano to show zarzuelas and circus variety shows as well as films. In 1897, after the release of the first Venezuelan films in Maracaibo, Ruiz went into business with Ricardo Rouffet to create their own films. Wolcopt then traveled around the country and Veyre left to Colombia before Carlos Ruiz peleando... was released, but his Cinematograph, which could both record and project film, may have been used to make Ruiz' films.

Azuaga García describes Ruiz' choice to hold film showings in a circus as "gaudy", as the previous screenings were held in spectacular theatres and halls, but also suggests it was Ruiz' attempt to "truly bring cinema to the popular classes".

Film screening and content
In November 1897, advertisements in Caracas start promoting "the new Projectoscope", claiming it played in color, and "criollo views", referring to the pair of films made by Venezuelans Ruiz and Rouffet. They also claimed that they would be the first Venezuelan-made films to play in the capital.

In the film, Ruiz as a character gets into a stagecoach heist and a fight with its coachman; Azuaga García notes that the devised situation makes this film an early attempt at narrative staging. Despite the fictional scenario, the films may have been advertised to the French as showing "real things" from life in the Caracas area.

Sueiro Villanueva proposes that Rouffet was the film's active director, but also proposes that someone else altogether could have handled the camera, acting as director but staying absent from the public screenings. Details on neither Rouffet nor the films were published in the local press, suggesting that it was critically overlooked.

References

Sources
Literature

Web

1897 short films
1897 comedy films
1897 films
Venezuelan black-and-white films
Venezuelan comedy films
Venezuelan silent short films
Silent comedy films